Lawrence Edward Miggins (born August 20, 1925) is an American former outfielder and first baseman in Major League Baseball who played for the St. Louis Cardinals in parts of the  and  seasons. He was born in The Bronx, New York to Irish immigrants.

Miggins was signed by the New York Giants in 1944 and was assigned immediately to Double-A Jersey City, then the top farm system affiliate of the Giants, but his baseball career was interrupted late in the year after he entered service in the United States Merchant Navy during World War II. Following his discharge, Miggins rejoined Jersey City in 1946, being obtained a year later by the Cardinals from the Giants in the Rule 5 draft. In 1946, Miggins was the starting third basemen for the Jersey City Giants when they played the Montreal Royals on Opening Day. That game marked the professional debut of Jackie Robinson. As of 2022, Miggins is the last surviving member of the Giants from that game.In two seasons at St. Louis, Miggins posted a .227 batting average (22-for-97) in 43 games, including five doubles, one triple and two home runs, while driving in 10 runs and scoring seven times. His childhood friend, Vin Scully, called Miggins's first home run.

Miggins also played nine seasons of Minor League ball between 1944 and 1954, batting .265 with 143 home runs in 944 games. After his baseball career, Miggins attended University of St. Thomas and went on to earn a master's degree from Sam Houston State. He later worked in the U.S. Probation and Parole office in Houston, and also served as baseball coach for his alma mater. In 2003, Miggins was inducted into the Texas Baseball Hall of Fame. Miggins is the last living player who played for the St. Louis Cardinals in the 1940s.

Sources

1925 births
Living people
Major League Baseball outfielders
St. Louis Cardinals players
Columbia Reds players
Columbus Red Birds players
Houston Buffaloes players
Jacksonville Tars players
Jersey City Giants players
Minneapolis Millers (baseball) players
Omaha Cardinals players
Sioux City Soos players
United States Merchant Mariners of World War II
American people of Irish descent
Sportspeople from the Bronx
Baseball players from New York City
Fordham Preparatory School alumni
Sam Houston State University alumni
University of St. Thomas (Texas) alumni